Marc Antoine may refer to:

Personal name
Marc Antoine, French version of Mark Antony (Marcus Antonius, 83–30 BC)
Marc Antoine (musician) (born 1963), French jazz fusion guitarist
Marc Antoine (singer) (born 1977), Haitian-Canadian singer

Given name
Marc-Antoine Charpentier (1643–1704), French composer of the Baroque era
Marc-Antoine Fortuné (born 1981), French professional footballer
Marc-Antoine Pouliot (born 1985), Canadian professional ice hockey player
Marc-Antoine Madeleine Désaugiers (1772–1827), French composer, dramatist and songwriter
Marc-Antoine Laugier (1713–1769), Jesuit priest and architectural theorist
Marc-Antoine Parseval (1755–1836), French mathematician
Marc-Antoine Pellin (born 1987), French basketball player
Marc Antoine de Beaumont (1763–1830), French nobleman
Muretus (Marc Antoine Muret, 1526–1585), French humanist and Latin prose stylist of the Renaissance

See also
Mark Anthony (disambiguation)
Marcus Antonius (disambiguation)